Ibrahim Gaidam is a Nigerian politician and the incumbent Senator of Yobe East Senatorial District, Nigeria since June 2019.
He was the immediate past governor of Yobe State, succeeded by the Former APC National Secretary, Mai Mala Buni on 29 May 2019.

Background
Ibrahim Gaidam was born on 15th September 1956 in Bukarti village, Yunusari local government area in
the old Borno, now Yobe state. He attended the Borno Teachers' College (BTC), Maiduguri from 1974 to 1979, where he obtained a Teachers' Certificate. He attended Ahmadu Bello University, Zaria from 1981 and 1983, earning a Diploma in Accountancy. Later he returned to Ahmadu Bello University, earned a BSc in Accountancy Degree in 1990 and became a member of the Certified Public Accountants of Nigeria.

Public service career
As an accountant, Ibrahim Gaidam worked in several government ministries in the old Borno State, later Yobe State. He was Assistant Director of Finance in the Directorate of Foods, Roads and Rural Infrastructure, acting Director of Finance and Supplies in the Yobe Information and Culture Ministry.
Ibrahim Gaidam left the civil service in 1995 when he was appointed the Commissioner for Youths and Sports, and then Commissioner of Commerce and Industries.
He returned to the civil service and from 1997 to 2007, he was a Director in the State Finance Ministry and Permanent Secretary in various other ministries.

Political career

In April 2007, Ibrahim Gaidam was elected Deputy Governor of Yobe State on the All Nigeria Peoples Party (ANPP) platform, and was sworn into office on May 29, 2007. He was sworn in as Executive Governor on January 27, 2009 following the death of Governor Mamman Bello Ali in Florida of a liver problem.
Alhaji Abubakar Ali, brother of Mamman Ali, was named as the new deputy governor.

Ibrahim Gaidam was appointed chair of the ANPP tactical committee for the 2011 elections.

Following violence and rioting incited by the Boko Haram radical Islamic sect in July 2009 in northern Nigeria, the Northern Governors' Forum (NGF) called an emergency meeting in Kaduna to discuss security matters. Of the nineteen governors of northern Nigeria, only Mu'azu Babangida Aliyu of Niger, Mohammed Namadi Sambo of Kaduna and Ibrahim Gaidam of  Yobe attended in person.

In November 2009, Ibrahim Gaidam gave a Sallah goodwill message to the people of Yobe State on the occasion of the Eid el-Kabir celebration. In his speech, he cautioned youths against being incited to violence by selfish religious teachers and rumour mongers, referring to the violence in July, 2009. He called on all Muslims to cooperate with each other and to co-habit peacefully with followers of other religions in the state.

Gaidam was elected on 26 April 2011 for a second term as governor.

Gaidam was also elected on 11 April 2015 for a third term as governor.

Geidam was elected as senator representing Yobe East in 9th NASS on 23 March 2019.

See also 
• list of governors of Yobe State

References

1956 births
Living people
Governors of Yobe State
All Nigeria Peoples Party politicians
Nigerian Muslims
Ahmadu Bello University alumni